Rontalon is a commune in the Rhône department of Auvergne-Rhône-Alpes in eastern France.

See also
Communes of the Rhône department

References 

Communes of Rhône (department)